American rock band Angels & Airwaves recorded songs for five studio albums and various extended plays. The majority of the group's original material is written by vocalist and guitarist Tom DeLonge. In all, the group has recorded 66 songs.

Songs

References

General
 

Specific

Angels and Airwaves